Edmund Bohan  (born 1935) is a New Zealand historian, biographer, novelist, singer, and author.

In the 2019 New Year Honours, Bohan was appointed a Member of the New Zealand Order of Merit, for services to music, historical research and literature.

Published works
 To Be a Hero: a biography of Sir George Grey (HarperCollins 1998).
 Singing Historian: A Memoir (Canterbury University Press, 2012).
 Edward Stafford: New Zealand's First Statesman (Hazard Press, 1994).

References

20th-century New Zealand historians
New Zealand biographers
Members of the New Zealand Order of Merit
Living people
1935 births